The Spanish Tercera División 2003–04 started in August 2003 and will end in June 2004 with the promotion play-off finals.

Classification

Grupo I

Grupo II

Grupo III

Grupo IV

Grupo V

Grupo VI

Grupo VII

Grupo VIII

Grupo IX

Grupo X

Grupo XI

Grupo XII

Grupo XIII

Grupo XIV

Grupo XV

Grupo XVI

Grupo XVII

References
Futbolme

 
Tercera División seasons
4
Spain